Malá Tŕňa (formerly) is a village and municipality in the Trebišov District in the Košice Region of south-eastern Slovakia.

History
In historical records the village was first mentioned in 1392.

Geography
The village lies at an altitude of 186 metres and covers an area of 9.807 km².
It has a population of about 450 people.

Ethnicity
The village is about 88% Slovak and 12% Hungarian.

Facilities
The village has a public library.

The village is located in the Tokaj wine region and contains several ancient wine cellars.

There is a viewing tower nearby the village

References

External links
https://web.archive.org/web/20071217080336/http://www.statistics.sk/mosmis/eng/run.html

Villages and municipalities in Trebišov District